Le Roy Purdy Smith is a former professional baseball pitcher and executive. He played all or part of eight seasons in Major League Baseball from  until . He has served as a scout for the New York Mets.

Playing career
Smith was drafted in the 3rd round of the 1979 Major League Baseball Draft by the Philadelphia Phillies. After three seasons in the Phillies' farm system, Smith and two other players, were traded to the Cleveland Indians late in the  season for pitcher John Denny.

After another season and a half in the minors, he made his major league debut on June 23, against the Seattle Mariners, a game in which he also picked up his first major league win.

Smith split  between the major and minor leagues once again, then was traded in the following off-season to the Minnesota Twins in a four-player deal. He had his best season that year, going 10–6 with a 3.92 ERA. He would fall to 5–10 with an ERA nearly a run higher the following season, and was released.

He continued to pitch in the minors until , when he finally retired.

Baseball executive
After spending his final season with the Buffalo Bisons in the Pittsburgh Pirates system, the Pirates made him a scout in 1994. He began as a scouting supervisor for the Pirates in the New England area. In 1995, Smith became scouting supervisor of the southwest portion of the United States. He then moved into the team's front office, first serving as special assistant for the general manager in 1988 before serving as assistant general manager from  until . He then moved on to the Los Angeles Dodgers. There, he worked as their Vice-President for Scouting and Player Development for two seasons, but left the organization along with his boss, Paul DePodesta, and returned to the Pirates. He later worked as a scout for the Toronto Blue Jays. He became a scout for the Mets in November 2010.

References

External links

Major League Baseball pitchers
Cleveland Indians players
Minnesota Twins players
Baltimore Orioles players
Helena Phillies players
Peninsula Pilots players
Reading Phillies players
Charleston Charlies players
Maine Guides players
Fordham Rams baseball players
Toledo Mud Hens players
Portland Beavers players
Rochester Red Wings players
Buffalo Bisons (minor league) players
Los Angeles Dodgers executives
Pittsburgh Pirates executives
Pittsburgh Pirates scouts
Toronto Blue Jays scouts
New York Mets scouts
Baseball players from New York (state)
1961 births
Living people
Mount Vernon High School (New York) alumni